Eisenberg is a mountain of Saxony, southeastern Germany.

See also 
List of mountains in the Ore Mountains

Mountains of Saxony
Mountains of the Ore Mountains